Soroni (Σορωνή) is a small village on the island of Rhodes, Greece, on the northwest coast of the island (36°21'45.81"N, 28° 0'5.80"E). It was the seat of the former municipality of Kameiros (Κάμειρος). Its population was 1,278 at the 2011 census. The island's main power plant is located just outside the village. 
There are 5 very active organizations: 
The Cultural and Folklore Association of Soroni Rhodes “Ampernalli” (ampernos= the oak tree),
The Athletic Association of Soroni Rhodes "Efklis"
The Athletic Association of Soroni Rhodes "Ages Kameiros 2009"
The Environment Association of Soroni Rhodes, The Assoziation of Women.

The most popular religious festival on the island is held at the chapel 'Agios Sylas' outside the village on the chapel's saint's day, every 20 to 30 of July. 
The village is situated 24 km from the city of Rhodes.

References

Populated places in Rhodes